The Faith of Donald J. Trump: A Spiritual Biography is a 2018 non-fiction book co-authored by David Brody and Scott Lamb about the religious faith of U.S. President Donald Trump. Shortly after its release, President Trump tweeted that it was a "very interesting read."

Reviewing it for The Weekly Standard, Erick Erickson noted, "the authors suggest that Trump’s rapacious libido is just his misguided quest for God." He added that they downplay Norman Vincent Peale's influence on President Trump, and concluded that the relationship between evangelical leaders and President Trump is "utterly transactional."

Reception 
The book was heavily criticized, and treated as a joke by many newspapers and organizations.

References

2018 non-fiction books
Books about Donald Trump
HarperCollins books